Samson and Delilah is a 1630 painting by Anthony van Dyck. Like his 1620 version of the subject, it is in the style of his former master Peter Paul Rubens. Unlike Rubens, however, van Dyck shows Delilah seemingly appalled at her own betrayal of Samson and regretting her act of treason, whereas Rubens showed him as a captive and her as an unscrupulous temptress. Van Dyck's palette in the work also reveals the influence of Titian during van Dyck's stay in Italy. It is now in the Kunsthistorisches Museum in Vienna.

See also
 100 Great Paintings

References

Beatrice Marshall, Old Blackfriars: A Story of the Days of Anthony Van Dyck (1901), Kessinger Publishing, 2009

1630 paintings
Religious paintings by Anthony van Dyck
Paintings in the collection of the Kunsthistorisches Museum
van Dyck
Dogs in art